Wewela (Lakota: wiwíla; "A spring") is an unincorporated community in Tripp County, South Dakota, United States. Wewela is located on U.S. Route 183 near the Nebraska border, south of Colome.

The community most likely was named for springs near the original town site, Wewela meaning "small spring" in the Sioux language.

References

Unincorporated communities in Tripp County, South Dakota
Unincorporated communities in South Dakota